The 1942 Milan–San Remo was the 35th edition of the Milan–San Remo cycle race and was held on 19 March 1942. The race started in Milan and finished in San Remo. The race was won by Adolfo Leoni of the  team.

General classification

References

Milan–San Remo
1942 in road cycling
1942 in Italian sport